Noar Linhas Aéreas S/A (Nordeste Aviação Regional Linhas Aéreas) was a Brazilian domestic airline with headquarters in Caruaru, Brazil. Regular scheduled services started on June 14, 2010.

History 
The company's main objective is to operate in the market of scheduled regional flights on the northeast region of Brazil, connecting its major centers. It was founded in 2009 and on May 14, 2010 the National Civil Aviation Agency (ANAC) granted the final authorization to start operations. Flights began on June 14, 2010.

On October 1, 2010, Noar started an operational agreement with Gol Airlines in which Noar acted as a feeder carrier for Gol at Recife. This agreement was suspended in September 2011.

Following operational complications after its July 13, 2011 accident, on September 20, 2011 Noar requested to ANAC the temporary suspension of its services.

On November 26, 2014 Noar lost its operational license.

Destinations 
Noar Linhas Aéreas operated scheduled services to the following destinations:
Aracaju – Santa Maria Airport
Caruaru – Caruaru Airport
João Pessoa – Presidente Castro Pinto International Airport
Maceió – Zumbi dos Palmares International Airport
Mossoró – Gov. Dix-Sept Rosado Airport
Natal – Augusto Severo International Airport
Paulo Afonso – Paulo Afonso Airport
Recife – Guararapes/Gilberto Freyre International Airport

Fleet 

As of December 2011, the fleet of Noar Linhas Aéreas included the following aircraft:

Airline affinity program 
Noar Linhas Aéreas had no Frequent Flyer Program.

Accidents and incidents 
13 July 2011: a Let L-410 Turbolet registration PR-NOB operating flight 4896 from Recife to Natal and Mossoró crashed shortly after take-off from Recife. All 16 occupants were killed.

See also 
List of defunct airlines of Brazil

References

External links 

Noar accidents as per Aviation Safety Database

Defunct airlines of Brazil
Airlines established in 2009
Airlines disestablished in 2011